Lashon Hakodesh (lit. "the tongue [of] holiness" or "the Holy Tongue"), also spelled L'shon Hakodesh or Leshon Hakodesh, is a Jewish term and appellation attributed to the Hebrew language, or sometimes to a mix of Hebrew and Aramaic, in which its religious texts and prayers were written, and served, during the Medieval Hebrew era, for religious purposes, liturgy and Halakha – in contrary to the secular tongue, which served for the routine daily needs, such as the Yiddish language.

Origins in the classical texts
The phrase's first appearance is already in the Mishnah:

In its narrow sense, Lashon Hakodesh refers not to the Hebrew language in its entirety, but rather to the Biblical Hebrew only. In its broader sense, it was used for combining Hebrew and Talmudic-Aramaic within the Rabbinic Hebrew, which served the purpose of writing the Jewish classical texts of the Middle Ages and the Early modern period.

The exact meaning of the phrase "Lashon Hakodesh" becomes clear due to its contrary term. In the Mishnah and the Gemara the term was aimed to take out the foreign languages that were commonly spoken among the Jewish communities:

The Rishonim sages perceived only Biblical Hebrew, and not the Mishnaic Hebrew, as "Lashon Hakodesh". In Yiddish, the term "Loshn Koydesh" serves to describe its own Hebrew-Aramaic component, as opposed to words originating from German or Slavic languages. In some Jewish Haredi denominations, the term is meant to describe old Hebrew as opposed to Modern Israeli Hebrew, and a few extreme Haredi denominations even try to avoid using renewed words since the Revival of the Hebrew language.

Jewish philosophers have offered various reasonings for Hebrew being the "Sacred Language".

Maimonides, in his book The Guide for the Perplexed (written in a Judeo-Arabic language), reasoned that the preference of the Hebrew language is based upon its internal characteristics:

Nahmanides disagrees with Maimonides' reasoning, and provides his own reasoning, based on the way the Hebrew was being used:

See also
Biblical Hebrew
Mishnaic Hebrew
Lotegorisch
Sacred language

References

Further reading
 Y. Frank & E.Z. Melamed (1991). Practical Talmud Dictionary. Feldheim Publishers. .
 R. C. Klein (2014). Lashon HaKodesh: History, Holiness, & Hebrew. Mosaica Press. .
 D. Leitner (2007). Understanding the Alef Beis. Feldheim Publishers. .
 M. Munk (1986). The Wisdom of the Hebrew Alphabet. Artscroll/Mesorah Publications. .

Hebrew language
Hebrew words and phrases
Sacred languages